Urepus is a genus of South American tangled nest spiders containing the single species, Urepus rossi. It was  first described by V. D. Roth in 1967, and has only been found in Peru.

References

Amaurobiidae
Monotypic Araneomorphae genera
Spiders of South America